Belagama Grama Niladhari Division is a Grama Niladhari Division of the Kolonnawa Divisional Secretariat  of Colombo District  of Western Province, Sri Lanka .  It has Grama Niladhari Division Code 504A.

Kotikawatta  are located within, nearby or associated with Belagama.

Belagama is a surrounded by the Kuda Buthgamuwa, Mulleriyawa North, Mulleriyawa South, Malpura, Kotikawatta West, Kotikawatta East and Kelanimulla  Grama Niladhari Divisions.

Demographics

Ethnicity 

The Belagama Grama Niladhari Division has a Sinhalese majority (91.4%) . In comparison, the Kolonnawa Divisional Secretariat (which contains the Belagama Grama Niladhari Division) has a Sinhalese majority (67.4%) and a significant Moor population (21.4%)

Religion 

The Belagama Grama Niladhari Division has a Buddhist majority (88.7%) . In comparison, the Kolonnawa Divisional Secretariat (which contains the Belagama Grama Niladhari Division) has a Buddhist majority (64.6%) and a significant Muslim population (23.1%)

Grama Niladhari Divisions of Kolonnawa Divisional Secretariat

References